All Yours is the second Korean-language studio album by South Korean boy band Astro. It was released on April 5, 2021, through Fantagio Music and Kakao Entertainment. All Yours was certified platinum by the KMCA for more than 250,000 copies sold of the album.

Track listing

Charts

Weekly charts

Year-end charts

Accolades

See also
 List of Gaon Album Chart number ones of 2021

Release history

References 

2021 albums
Astro (South Korean band) albums
Korean-language albums